Nancy Richey (born August 23, 1942) is an American former tennis player. Richey won two major singles titles (the 1967 Australian Championships and 1968 French Open) and four major women's doubles titles (the 1965 US Championships, 1966 Australian Championships, 1966 Wimbledon Championships, and 1966 US Championships). She was ranked world No. 2 in singles at year-end in 1969. Richey won 69 singles titles during her career and helped the US win the Federation Cup in 1969. She won the singles title at the U.S. Women's Clay Court Championships a record six consecutive years, from 1963 through 1968.

Richey married Kenneth S. Gunter on December 15, 1970. They were divorced on December 28, 1976, and Richey reverted to her maiden name. She is the sister of American tennis player Cliff Richey. They were the first brother-sister combination to both be concurrently ranked in the USA Top Ten. They were ranked in the Top Three concurrently in 1965, 1967, 1969 and 1970. Nancy Richey was inducted into the International Tennis Hall of Fame in 2003.

Grand Slam finals

Singles: 6 (2 titles, 4 runners-up)

Doubles: 6 (4 titles, 2 runners-up)

Grand Slam singles tournament timeline

1 The Australian Open was held twice in 1977, in January and December.
2 Richey did not play. Her opponent got a walkover.
3 Richey was seeded No. 7, but withdrew from the tournament before it began.

See also 
 Performance timelines for all female tennis players who reached at least one Grand Slam final

References

External links
 
 
 
 

American female tennis players
Australian Championships (tennis) champions
French Open champions
People from San Angelo, Texas
International Tennis Hall of Fame inductees
Tennis people from Texas
United States National champions (tennis)
Wimbledon champions (pre-Open Era)
1942 births
Living people
Grand Slam (tennis) champions in women's singles
Grand Slam (tennis) champions in women's doubles
21st-century American women